Ayumu (born 24 April 2000) is a chimpanzee currently living at the Primate Research Institute of Kyoto University. He is the son of chimpanzee Ai and has been a participant since infancy in the Ai Project, an ongoing research effort aimed at understanding chimpanzee cognition. As part of the Ai Project, Ayumu participated in a series of short-term memory tasks, such as to remember the sequential order of numbers displaying on a touch-sensitive computer screen. His performance in the tasks was superior to that of comparably trained university students, leading to a possible conclusion that young chimpanzees have better working memory than adult humans, although this has been disputed.

See also
 List of individual apes

External links 
Ayumu's game. For those who want to measure their memorization skills against chimpanzees: https://mtriad.github.io/1/

References

Individual chimpanzees
2000 animal births
Individual animals in Japan